Aukhadiev Kenes Mustakhanovich (27 December 1938 – 23 January 2022) was a Soviet-Kazakh politician. A member of the Communist Party, he served as First Secretary of the Alma-Ata Regional Committee of the Communist Party of Kazakhstan from 1978 to 1985. He died on 23 January 2022, at the age of 83.

References

1938 births
2022 deaths
Soviet politicians
Kazakhstani politicians
Communist Party of the Soviet Union members
Central Committee of the Communist Party of the Soviet Union members
Tenth convocation members of the Soviet of Nationalities
Eleventh convocation members of the Soviet of Nationalities
Recipients of the Order of Parasat
People from Almaty Region